Garston railway station serves the Garston area of Watford in Hertfordshire, England.  It is the third station on the Abbey Line after Watford Junction and Watford North.  The station and all trains serving it are operated by London Northwestern Railway.

Like all the other stations on the branch, Garston is an unstaffed railway halt. At opening by British Rail in 1966 it was a welcome addition to a branch which was otherwise being heavily rationalised.

History
The station was opened by the Mayor of Watford on 7 February 1966. It consisted of just a short wooden platform, and was probably the first new station (as opposed to a relocation) in Great Britain following the Beeching Report of 1963, which led to the closure of many stations.

In 2010 the station was improved with new signage, a new shelter, new lighting & artwork by children from Berry Grove Primary School (now The Grove Academy) - a local school located at the end of Fourth Avenue.

Services
All services at Garston are operated by London Northwestern Railway. This is increased to a train approximately every 45 minutes in each direction during the peak hours. Services are typically operated using  EMUs.

Connections
The station is served by the Uno route 635 which provides connections to Watford, Hatfield, Stevenage and Hitchin.

Future
Possible changes on the line include new means of buying tickets, and the restoration of a passing loop at Bricket Wood, which would facilitate a 30-minute train service. In October 2009 the Department for Transport announced plans to convert the line to light rail.

References

External links

Garston station at abbeyline.org.uk

Railway stations in Watford
Railway stations opened by British Rail
Railway stations in Great Britain opened in 1966
Railway stations served by West Midlands Trains